Taurus missile may refer to:

KEPD 350, a German/Swedish air-launched cruise missile
RGM-59 Taurus, an unbuilt American surface-to-surface missile